Manuel Pizarro may refer to:
  (1805–1888), Argentinian political who was succeeded by Servando Bayo as senator for Santa Fe
 Manuel Pizarro Cenjor (1889–1954), deputy director of the Spanish Civil Guard during World War II
 Manuel Pizarro Moreno (born 1951), Spanish jurist and politician
 Manuel Pizarro (politician) (born 1964), Portuguese politician
 Manuel D. Pizarro (1841–1909), Argentinian revolutionary figure